J. P. Morgan (1837–1913) was an American banking tycoon.

J. P. Morgan may also refer to:

J. P. Morgan, Jr. (1867–1943), son of J. P. Morgan and American philanthropist
Jaye P. Morgan (born 1931), American singer and actress

Business
JPMorgan Chase, large financial services company formed through the merger of J.P. Morgan & Co. and Chase Manhattan Bank in 2000
J.P. Morgan & Co., former banking house also known as the House of Morgan

Morgan J. P.